Kiçik Əmili (also, Kichik Emili and Kichik-Amili) is a village and municipality in the Qabala Rayon of Azerbaijan.  It has a population of 577.

References 

Populated places in Qabala District